Just Wailin is an album recorded by flautist Herbie Mann, tenor saxophonist Charlie Rouse, guitarist Kenny Burrell and pianist Mal Waldron in 1958 for the New Jazz label.

Reception

AllMusic reviewer Scott Yanow stated: "The straight-ahead jam session has its strong moments, and as long as one doesn't let their expectations get out of hand, the music will be enjoyable despite the lack of wild sparks".

Track listing
All compositions by Mal Waldron, except as indicated
 "Minor Groove" - 7:34
 "Blue Echo" - 4:15
 "Blue Dip" (Kenny Burrell) - 9:23
 "Gospel Truth" - 10:43
 "Jumpin' With Symphony Sid" (Lester Young) - 3:29
 "Trinidad" (Cal Massey) - 4:28

Personnel 
Herbie Mann - flute
Charlie Rouse - tenor saxophone
Mal Waldron - piano
Kenny Burrell - guitar
George Joyner - bass
Art Taylor - drums

References 

1958 albums
Herbie Mann albums
Charlie Rouse albums
Kenny Burrell albums
Mal Waldron albums
New Jazz Records albums
Albums produced by Bob Weinstock
Albums recorded at Van Gelder Studio